Flash protection is a term used in the design and specification of protective suits, particularly in bomb disposal. Note is often made in specifications of Hazmat or NBC suits etc. of whether they are "flash protective", meaning they are protective of the wearer against (exclusively or inclusively) flame, fragmentation or impact.

Emergency services